Ailford's halt opened in c1894 and closed in 1992. It was on the Kingston to Montego Bay line,  from the Kingston terminus, and served the surrounding agricultural community.

Architecture
By definition, halts have no station building or platform.

Track layout
A single track with a marked place for trains to stop alongside the B8 road, which runs from Ferris Corner (near Savanna-la-Mar) to Reading (near Montego Bay).

Fares
In 1910 the third class fare from Albany to Kingston was 8/- (eight shillings); first class was about double.

See also
Railways of Jamaica
Railway stations in Jamaica

References

Bibliography

External links
Aerial view of site.

Railway stations in Jamaica
Buildings and structures in Saint James Parish, Jamaica
Railway stations opened in 1894
Railway stations closed in 1992